Gabbard may refer to:

 Gabbard (surname)
 Tulsi Gabbard (born 1981), American politician and former member of the Democratic Party
 Battle of the Gabbard, in the First Anglo-Dutch War 
 Greater Gabbard, future wind farm due in England
 HMS Gabbard (D47), Battle-class destroyer of the Royal Navy
 The Gabbards, a Christian American Southern Gospel group
 A variant spelling of Gabbart, an inland sailing barge.

See also 
 Gabbert